"Hide U" is a song by British electronic music group Kosheen, written by group members Sian Evans, Mark Morrison, and Darren Beale. The song was originally released in 2000 and reached number 73 in the band's home country as a double A-side with "Empty Skies". The track was then remixed and re-released in 2001 as the lead single from Kosheen's debut album, Resist (2001), this time reaching number six on the UK Singles Chart. Outside the UK, the single peaked at number one in Greece and Romania, became a top-five hit in Belgium and the Netherlands, and entered the top 40 in Australia, Italy, and Sweden.

Release and reception
Via Jive Records, "Hide U" was first released in Benelux on 5 May 2000, becoming a top-five hit in both Belgium and the Netherlands later in the year. In Belgium, the song charted in the Flanders region, peaking at number three for two weeks in October and ending the year as the region's 33rd-best-selling hit of 2000. In the Netherlands, the track reached number four on the Dutch Top 40 and number five on the Single Top 100. On 5 June 2000, Moksha Recordings released "Hide U" as a double A-side with "Empty Skies" in the United Kingdom. The single initially peaked at number 73 on the UK Singles Chart. Follow-up singles "Catch" / "Demonstrate" and "(Slip & Slide) Suicide" failed to surpass the UK peak of "Hide U" / "Empty Skies".

On 20 August 2001, Arista Records re-released "Hide U" as a solo single in the UK, this time in a remixed form by John Creamer & Stephane K. This release was more successful commercially, debuting and peaking at number six on the UK Singles Chart. The song was subsequently released for the first time in several European countries and Australia. In Europe, the song topped the Romanian Top 100, where it was ranked number 20 on the 2001 year-end chart, and on the Greek Singles Chart, earning a gold sales certifications for shipping over 10,000 copies in Greece. Elsewhere, the single entered the top 40 in Italy and Sweden while also charting in Ireland and Germany. In Australia, "Hide U" was released across two CD formats in October 2001, peaking at number 23 on the Australian Singles Chart that December.

Track listings

2000 release

UK CD single
 "Empty Skies" – 4:12
 "Hide U" – 4:50
 "I Was Wrong" – 3:33

UK 12-inch single
A1. "Hide U" – 4:48
A2. "Hide U" (acapella) – 1:06
B1. "Empty Skies" (floor mix) – 7:22

Benelux CD single
 "Hide U" (radio edit) – 3:57
 "Hide U" – 4:48

Benelux 12-inch single
A1. "Hide U" – 4:48
A2. "Hide U" (acapella) – 1:06
B1. "Hide U" (ES Dubs remix) – 4:07

2001 release

UK CD1
 "Hide U" (John Creamer & Stephane K radio edit) – 3:32
 "Hide U" (John Creamer & Stephane K remix edit) – 5:31
 "Hide U" (Rollo and Sister Bliss remix edit) – 6:29
 "Hide U" (album version) – 4:12

UK CD2
 "Hide U" (original) – 4:50
 "Playing Games" – 4:14
 "Get It Right" – 4:10

UK 12-inch single
A. "Hide U" (John Creamer & Stephane K remix) – 9:19
B. "Hide U" (Rollo and Sister Bliss remix) – 8:09

European CD single
 "Hide U" (John Creamer & Stephane K radio edit) – 3:32
 "Hide U" (original) – 4:50

Australian CD single
 "Hide U" (John Creamer & Stephane K radio edit) – 3:33
 "Hide U" (original 12-inch version) – 4:48
 "Hide U" (John Creamer & Stephane K remix) – 9:19
 "Hide U" (ES Dubs remix) – 5:27
 "Hide U" (Decoder & Substance 170 Mix) – 7:16
 "Hide U" (Decoder & Substance Green Mix) – 7:17

Australian maxi-CD single
 "Hide U" (John Creamer & Stephane K radio edit) – 3:33
 "Hide U" (album version) – 4:12
 "Hide U" (Rollo and Sister Bliss remix) – 8:06
 "Playing Games" – 4:14
 "Get It Right" – 4:10

Credits and personnel
Credits are lifted from the 2001 UK CD1 liner notes.

Studio
 Recorded at Ledge Studios One (Bristol, England)

Personnel

 Sian Evans – writing
 Mark Morrison – writing
 Darren Beale – writing

 Decoder & Substance – production, mixing
 Blue Source – design
 Patrice Hanicotte – photography

Charts

Weekly charts

Year-end charts

Certifications

Release history

See also
 List of Romanian Top 100 number ones of the 2000s

References

2001 singles
2001 songs
Arista Records singles
Jive Records singles
Kosheen songs
Number-one singles in Greece
Number-one singles in Romania